"Casual Party" is the lead single taken from American rock band Band of Horses' fifth studio album Why Are You OK. Peaking at #4 on the Adult Alternative Songs chart and #23 on the Alternative Songs chart, it is their most successful song to date.

Chart performance

Weekly charts

Year-end charts

References

2016 singles
Band of Horses songs
2016 songs
American Recordings (record label) singles
Songs written by Ben Bridwell